Dave Winters (born June 30, 1952) is a former Illinois State Representative for the 68th district, serving from 1995 to 2012.

Biography
Dave Winters was born on June 30, 1952. He graduated from Dartmouth College with a B.A. in History (High Honors) and the University of Illinois at Urbana-Champaign with an M.S. in Agricultural Economics. He married Kathleen Wise. The couple has two children, fraternal twins Theresa and Colin (born July 14, 1981).

Political career
Winters served in the Illinois House of Representatives from 1995 until his resignation in July 2012, and was Assistant Republican House Leader from 2003 to 2009.  His legislative assignments included environmental/energy issues, child support enforcement, and local telecommunication development.  He worked at both local and state levels in addressing these issues.

During the 2008 Republican Party presidential primaries, Winters served on the Illinois leadership team of the presidential campaign of former New York City Mayor Rudy Giuliani.

Local organizations:
Winnebago County Zoning Board of Appeals, 1993–95
Board Member, League of Women Voters
Board Member, Rockford/Winnebago County Planning Commission
Board Member, Shirland Township Clerk
Board Member, Sinnissippi Audubon Society
Board Member, Sinnissippi Open Space Committee, Natural Land Institute
Board Member, Winnebago County Farm Bureau
Legislative Committees:
Air, Member
Committee of the Whole, Member
Electric Utility Oversight, Member
Environment and Energy, Member
Environmental Health, Ranking Minority Member
Gaming, Member
Labor, Ranking Minority Member
Renewable Energy, Member
Telecommunications, Member

References

External links
Dave Winters official website
Illinois General Assembly - Representative Dave Winters (R) 68th District official IL House website
Bills Committees
Project Vote Smart - Representative David 'Dave' Winters (IL) profile
Follow the Money - Dave Winters
2006 2004 2002 2000 1998 1996 campaign contributions
Illinois House Republican Caucus - Dave Winters profile

1952 births
Living people
Dartmouth College alumni
Republican Party members of the Illinois House of Representatives
Politicians from Springfield, Illinois
University of Illinois College of Agriculture, Consumer, and Environmental Sciences alumni
21st-century American politicians
County board members in Illinois